(born 22 May 1987 in Hyogo, Japan) is a Japanese rugby union player. Hiwasa has played 28 international matches for the Japan national rugby union team.

Hiwasa was a member of the Japan team at the 2011 Rugby World Cup, and played four matches for the Brave Blossoms.

Hiwasa currently plays for Top League team Suntory Sungoliath. He commenced playing for the club in 2010.

References

External links
 Top League Profile, in Japanese
 Suntory Sungoliath Profile, in Japanese
 Player Statistics from itsrugby.co.uk

Living people
1987 births
Japanese rugby union players
Tokyo Sungoliath players
Japan international rugby union players
Rugby union scrum-halves
Sportspeople from Kobe
Sunwolves players
Stade Français players
Kobelco Kobe Steelers players